In mathematical finance, the CEV or constant elasticity of variance model is a stochastic volatility model that attempts to capture stochastic volatility and the leverage effect. The model is widely used by practitioners in the financial industry, especially for modelling equities and commodities. It was developed by John Cox in 1975.

Dynamic 

The CEV model describes a process which evolves according to the following stochastic differential equation:

in which S is the spot price, t is time, and μ is a parameter characterising the drift, σ and γ are other parameters, and W is a Brownian motion.
And so we have 

The constant parameters  satisfy the conditions . 

The parameter  controls the relationship between volatility and price, and is the central feature of the model. When  we see an effect, commonly observed in equity markets, where the volatility of a stock increases as its price falls and the leverage ratio increases. Conversely, in commodity markets, we often observe , whereby the volatility of the price of a commodity tends to increase as its price increases and leverage ratio decreases. If we observe  this model is considered the model which was proposed by Louis Bachelier in his PhD Thesis "The Theory of Speculation".

See also
Volatility (finance)
Stochastic volatility
SABR volatility model
CKLS process

References

External links
Asymptotic Approximations to CEV and SABR Models
Price and implied volatility under CEV model with closed formulas, Monte-Carlo and Finite Difference Method
Price and implied volatility of European options in CEV Model delamotte-b.fr
 

Options (finance)
Derivatives (finance)
Financial models